Kal is a small village just west of Ambrus in the Municipality of Ivančna Gorica in central Slovenia. The area is part of the historical region of Lower Carniola. The municipality is now included in the Central Slovenia Statistical Region.

Church

The local church is dedicated to Saint Lucy and belongs to the Parish of Ambrus. It was originally built in the 17th century, but largely rebuilt in 1836.

References

External links

Kal on Geopedia

Populated places in the Municipality of Ivančna Gorica